Tunisia has submitted films for the Academy Award for Best International Feature Film on an irregular basis since 1995. The award is handed out annually by the United States Academy of Motion Picture Arts and Sciences to a feature-length motion picture produced outside the United States that contains primarily non-English dialogue. , eight Tunisian films have been submitted for the Academy Award for Best Foreign Language Film, and only one, The Man Who Sold His Skin, was nominated for an Oscar.

Submissions
The Academy of Motion Picture Arts and Sciences has invited the film industries of various countries to submit their best film for the Academy Award for Best Foreign Language Film since 1956. The Foreign Language Film Award Committee oversees the process and reviews all the submitted films. Following this, they vote via secret ballot to determine the five nominees for the award. Below is a list of the films that have been submitted by Tunisia for review by the Academy for the award by year and the respective Academy Awards ceremony.

Tunisia's first two Oscar submissions were dramas with exceptionally similar plots, both revolving around the influence of cinema on the life of impressionable young Tunisian boys. Le Magique is a semi-autobiographical story, based on the life of director Melliti, in which a young boy is left home alone to watch over the family residence when his impoverished family emigrates to France. The boy discovers the joy of movies at a local cinema and begins to try and re-enact them (sans camera) with his friends. In The Magic Box, a Tunisian director in France is writing a screenplay based on his life as a boy in Tunisia, seen through flashbacks, in which his strict, religious father tried to instill different values in him than his more liberal film-loving uncles. Both films were primarily in French, with some Arabic dialogue.

See also
 List of Academy Award winners and nominees for Best Foreign Language Film
 List of Academy Award-winning foreign language films
 Cinema of Tunisia

Notes

References

External links
 The Official Academy Awards Database
 The Motion Picture Credits Database

Best Foreign Language Film Academy Award submissions by country
Academy Award for Best Foreign Language Film
Lists of films by country of production
Academy Award